The Loan Ranger Bandit is an American bank robber who committed a series of bank robberies throughout the states of Texas, Mississippi, Kentucky and Arkansas, beginning in 2009. The Loan Ranger Bandit has been positively identified as 37-year-old Richard Swicegood of Waxahachie, Texas following a traffic stop by Arkansas State Police in early July, 2014 thanks to his trademark mask, gun and bag with a dollar sign on it. The traffic stop followed a robbery of the Sumit Bank in Benton, Arkansas on July 1, 2014 believed to have been committed by Swicegood.

The robber is responsible for at least ten separate bank robberies according to the FBI. In addition, the FBI's major case hotline cites a number of initial options to a caller, one of which is for those seeking to provide information to the FBI on the Loan Ranger Bandit. Swicegood is incarcerated.

References

External links

FBI page (Archived)
 http://www.wdrb.com/story/22219426/suspect-sought-in-bank-robbery-on-brownsboro-road

American bank robbers